Białous is a Polish-language surname, a version of Białowąs or Belous. Notable people with the surname include:

Ryszard Białous (1914–1942), Polish scoutmaster
Franciszek Białous (1901–1980), Polish microbiologist

Polish-language surnames